Dorothée Jemma (born 16 June 1956) is a French actress specializing in dubbing. She is the dub voice of Jennifer Aniston, Melanie Griffith and Sheryl Lee.

Biography
Her father, Jean-Louis Jemma, is best known for the dub voice of Zorro. She originally wanted to be a dancer, but her father turned her towards the world of theater. She started her career as an actress at the age of 16.

Living in the countryside, she enjoys horseback-riding and skiing.

Theater

Filmography

Dubbing

References

External links
 

1956 births
Living people
French film actresses
French stage actresses
French television actresses
French video game actresses
French voice actresses